A cawnie is an obsolete unit of land area used in Chennai (formerly Madras) in India. It was approximately equal to 1.322 acres. In SI units that is 5349 square metres. After metrication in the mid-20th century, the unit became obsolete. It is also known as Kani. 1 kani is equal to 57600 Square Feet.

See also
List of customary units of measurement in South Asia

References

External links

Units of area
Customary units in India
Obsolete units of measurement